The 2010 CAR Development Trophy, also known as the 2010 African Development Trophy, was the seventh edition of third (former second) level rugby union tournament in Africa. The competition involved ten teams that are divided into two zones North, central and south.

Two tournaments were held in northern and southern zones. The northern tournament was held in Cairo, Egypt. The southern tournament was held in an away/home legs.

North Tournament

Semifinals

Third place match

Final

South Tournament

See also
2010 Africa Cup
2010 Africa Trophy

References

External links
2010 International Rugby Fixtures and Results - rugbyinternational.net

2010
2010 rugby union tournaments for national teams
2010 in African rugby union
CAR Development